Triops vincentinus is a species of freshwater crustacean tadpole shrimps.

It is endemic to Portugal, and only found within the Faro District.

It diverged from Triops cancriformis about 180 million years ago during the Middle Jurassic Epoch.

References

Notostraca
Freshwater crustaceans of Europe
Endemic arthropods of Portugal
Faro District
Jurassic crustaceans
Extant Middle Jurassic first appearances
Middle Jurassic animals
Middle Jurassic Europe
Crustaceans described in 2010